Fargesia Rufa can refer to bamboos of the genus Fargesia:

 Fargesia 'Rufa', aka. Gansu 95-1
 Fargesia rufa, aka. qingchuan jianzhu